The EOS C300 is a digital cinema camera in the Cinema EOS range. It was announced by Canon on November 3, 2011.

The camera is offered with the option of Canon EF or Arri PL mounts. It has been available since January 2012.

In September 2015, Canon released an updated version, the Canon EOS C300 Mark II.

Specifications
In 2011, the Canon EOS C300 was originally announced with the following characteristics:

8.3mp 3840x2160 Super-35 CMOS sensor (QFHD resolution)
DIGIC DV III Processor
Canon XF Codec
Dual Compact Flash Slots
Exposure and focus are both manual only
Uses existing BP-955 and BP-975 batteries
Sold as a system, including LCD monitor / XLR audio unit, side grip, and top handle.
Availability: January 2012
Price: appx. US$20,000 in 2011; note that price had dropped to appx. US$11,000 in 2022

Sample footage
Vincent Laforet was given access to a pre-release version of the EOS C300 to shoot the short film Möbius (2011).

In addition, the C300 was used along with Canon EOS DSLRs (such as an infrared-modified Canon EOS 5D Mark II) on the short film When You Find Me (2011), directed by Bryce Dallas Howard and produced by her father Ron Howard.

A Canon EOS C300 was used with a drone to shoot aerial footage on the "small-budget" Kevin Macdonald film How I Live Now (2013).

See also
Canon
Canon EOS

References

External links 

C300
Digital movie cameras